Siliștea is a commune in Teleorman County, Muntenia, Romania. It is composed of three villages: Butești, Siliștea and Siliștea Mică. It also included Purani and Puranii de Sus villages until 2004, when they were split off to form Purani commune.

References

Communes in Teleorman County
Localities in Muntenia